The COVID-19 pandemic in Moldova is part of the worldwide pandemic of coronavirus disease 2019 caused by severe acute respiratory syndrome coronavirus 2. The virus was confirmed to have reached the Republic of Moldova on 7 March 2020, when a Moldovan woman who returned from Italy tested positive for the novel coronavirus. As the number of infected people started to rise during the next days, the Parliament declared a state of emergency on 17 March 2020 for the entire territory of the Republic of Moldova for a period of 60 days (17 March to 15 May 2020).

On 15 May 2020, the last day of the state of emergency declared by the Parliament on 17 March 2020, the Extraordinary National Commission of Public Health declared the state of emergency in public health for the entire territory of Moldova for the period of 16 May to 30 June 2020. On 9 June 2020, the total number of confirmed cases surpassed 10,000. On 1 September 2020, the number of deaths surpassed 1,000.

The vaccination process started on 2 March 2021 with AstraZeneca vaccine units donated by Romania to Moldova.

Background 
On 12 January, the World Health Organization (WHO) confirmed that a novel coronavirus was the cause of a respiratory illness in a cluster of people in Wuhan City, Hubei Province, China, who had initially come to the attention of the WHO on 31 December 2019.

Unlike SARS of 2003, the case fatality ratio for COVID-19 has been much lower, but the transmission has been significantly greater, with a significant total death toll.

Timeline

Before 24 February 2020 
 23 January 2020: in the context of prevention and early detection of 2019-nCoV, the management of the Ministry of Health, Labour and Social Protection and representatives of the National Agency for Public Health and the National Center for Pre-hospital Emergency Medical Assistance had a meeting with the Ambassador Extraordinary and Plenipotentiary of the People's Republic of China to the Republic of Moldova, Mr. Zhang Yinghong. During the meeting, vigilance and preventive measures related to the spread of the virus were discussed. The Ambassador showed openness to provide all the necessary information support to Moldova regarding the evolution of the new coronavirus spread and the steps taken by the Chinese authorities.
 24 January 2020: the Ministry of Health, Labour and Social Protection issued the first press-release on the prevention and control measures related to the infection with the new type of Coronavirus (2019-nCoV). In the press-release, it was stated that the epidemiological situation at national level regarding the infection with 2019-nCoV is daily monitored by the National Agency for Public Health, and if there are suspect or detected cases of 2019-nCoV, specialized anti-epidemic teams are ready to intervene. It was also stated that the virology laboratory within the National Agency for Public Health has facilities, equipment and trained personnel for laboratory diagnosis of the most common viruses: influenza (A and B), non-influenza (RSV, Coronavirus, including MERS-CoV) and bacteria (Pneumococcus, Haemophilus influenzae type B, staphylococcus) to confirm acute respiratory infections.
 27 January 2020: the Minister of Health, Labour and Social Protection Mrs. Viorica Dumbrăveanu convened an extended meeting of the Commission for Exceptional Situations and Public Health Emergencies of the Ministry of Health, Labour and Social Protection. This meeting was also attended by representatives of the Ministry of Foreign Affairs and European Integration, the Ministry of Internal Affairs, the Ministry of Finance, the General Inspectorate of Border Police, the Customs Service, the National Insurance Company in Medicine, the National Food Safety Agency and the National Agency for Public Health. Participants discussed the measures to prevent and control the infection with the new type Coronavirus (2019-nCov), based on the epidemiological situation and the global spread of the infection.
 2 February 2020: the Extraordinary National Commission of Public Health was convened by the Prime Minister Mr. Ion Chicu. The commission has examined the information presented by the Ministry of Health, Labour and Social Protection and found that the epidemiological situation related to the infection with the novel Coronavirus (2019-nCoV) is tense, which has led the World Health Organization to declare a Public Health Emergency of International Concern. The commission adopted the Decision No. 1 which provides, inter alia, that risk assessment for public health will continue to be carried out with the attribution, if necessary, of the alert code resulting from the epidemiological situation related to the infection with the new Coronavirus (2019-nCoV).
 18 February 2020: the National Agency for Public Health received from Germany, with the support of the World Health Organization, test kits to detect the virus that causes COVID-19.

Code yellow alert (24 February – 7 March 2020) 
 24 February 2020: the Extraordinary National Commission of Public Health was convened by the Prime-minister Mr. Ion Chicu. The commission adopted the Decision No. 2 which provides, inter alia, the establishment of the Code Yellow alert at national level in the context of the epidemiological situation related to COVID-19 infection and considering the possible risk for a public health emergency.
 25 February 2020: the Republic of Moldova has put into action some anti-coronavirus measures. The Minister of Health, Labour and Social Protection, Mrs. Viorica Dumbrăveanu, convened in a meeting the representatives of the public medical-sanitary institutions, the Ministry of Internal Affairs, the General Inspectorate of Border Police and the National Center for Pre-hospital Emergency Medical Assistance. During the meeting was examined the activity of the National Agency for Public Health, in its quality of International Health Regulations (IHR) National Focal Point, regarding the control and prevention at national level of the infection with the new type of Coronavirus and the future measures to be taken. On that meeting, the Minister of Health, Labour and Social Protection declared that starting from that day (25 February 2020), the authorities will meet every day at 7:30 am and will provide information on what happened during the last 24 hours, what measures have been taken and what are the difficulties. It was decided that these meetings will take place as long as there is a risk of importing and spreading the new type of coronavirus.
 26 February 2020: the customers of Moldovan mobile phone operators received from the Government an SMS on precautionary measures to prevent the infection with the new coronavirus. The message was the following: "Take care of your health. Call immediately your family doctor if you have a fever or cough. If you have returned from areas with Coronavirus and are feeling unwell, call 112" (the original message in Romanian: "Aveti grija de sanatate. Sunati imediat medicul de familie daca aveti febra sau tuse. Daca V-ati intors din zone cu Coronavirus si Va simtiti rau, sunati 112"). This action to inform the population was carried out at the initiative of the Ministry of Health, Labour and Social Protection, within the national information campaign on the prevention of the coronavirus infection. In order to answer to many speculations related to the question "Where does the Government get the phone numbers from?", the above-mentioned Ministry explained that this initiative was a free social action organized in partnership with the Moldovan mobile phone operators.

The first case (7 March 2020) 
The first coronavirus case in the Republic of Moldova was announced on 7 March 2020. The infected person is a 48-year-old woman who had returned to Moldova from Italy with the flight Milano-Chisinau. She had been taken to hospital immediately from the plane, being in a serious condition: bilateral bronchopneumonia, acute respiratory failure, fever, cough, general weakness. She has a few chronic illnesses: diabetes, overweight and hypertension. According to the Ministry of Health, Labour and Social Protection of Moldova, she was diagnosed with bilateral bronchopneumonia, fever and cough on 4 March in Italy. She was prescribed antibiotic treatment at home and put in home quarantine pending confirmation of a new type of coronavirus infection, but she decided to return to Moldova.

Code orange alert (8–12 March 2020) 
 8 March 2020: the Extraordinary National Commission of Public Health established the Code Orange alert at national level in the context of the epidemiological situation related to COVID-19 infection.
 10 March 2020: the Ministry of Health, Labour and Social Protection of Moldova confirmed another two cases (the 2nd and the 3rd) of coronavirus. The infected people are a woman and a man, both of them returned from Italy, on 26 February and 1 March, respectively. On the same day all foreigners coming from the countries affected by coronavirus have been banned from entering Moldova by plane.
 11 March 2020: the 4th case has been confirmed. Government announced that it closing all kindergartens, schools, colleges and universities for two weeks.
 12 March 2020: 2 new cases (the 5th and the 6th) were confirmed. As per 12 March 2020, there were no confirmed cases in the Transnistrian region, but 8 people were quarantined after returning from abroad.

Code red alert (13–16 March 2020) 
 13 March 2020: the Extraordinary National Commission of Public Health established the Code Red alert at national level in the context of the epidemiological situation related to COVID-19 infection. During this day other 2 new cases (the 7th and the 8th) have been confirmed.
 14 March 2020: 4 new cases were confirmed. Thus, the total number of infected people reached 12.
 15 March 2020: 11 new cases were confirmed. The total number of infected people reached 23.
 16 March 2020: 6 new cases were confirmed. The total number is 29. One woman recovered.

State of emergency (17 March – 15 May 2020)

17–31 March 2020 
 17 March 2020: the Parliament declared the state of emergency for the entire territory of the Republic of Moldova for a period of 60 days (17 March - 15 May 2020). During 17 March 2020, the 30th case has been confirmed.
 18 March 2020: the first death was confirmed, a 61-year-old woman who had travelled to Italy. Another 6 new cases of infection have been confirmed.
 19 March 2020: 13 new cases were confirmed. The total number of infected people since 7 March 2020 reached 49.
 20 March 2020: 17 new cases were confirmed, and the total number of infected people since 7 March 2020 reached 66. Upon the request of MoH, based on WHO Moldova recommendations short-list, Trimetrica LLC /www.trimetrica.com/ (ESRI Partner in Moldova) launched the customized ArcGIS Dashboard (an online platform) - allowing the real-time monitoring of COVID-19 cases in the Republic of Moldova. It's updated for 2 times per day. The platform is accessible at this link: gismoldova.maps.arcgis.com
 21 March 2020: 14 new cases were confirmed, the total number of infected people since 7 March 2020 reaching 80. Out of these 14 new cases, 2 cases were recorded for the first time in the Transnistrian region. At the same time, it was announced that the first person infected and confirmed in the Republic of Moldova (on 7 March 2020), was treated and transferred to another section for recovery against other chronic diseases. Thus, the number of recovered persons reached 2.
 27 March 2020: the second death was confirmed, a 79 years old woman who was a doctor working at the Emergency Medical Assistance Service. She got sick on 19 March, and on 24 March she was admitted to the Republican Clinical Hospital, in serious condition. The patient with several chronic diseases (diabetes, heart failure, high blood pressure). During 27 March 2020, 22 new cases were confirmed, the total number of infected people since 7 March 2020 reaching 199. On the same day, 3 patients recovered, the total number of recoveries reaching 5.
 29 March 2020: the third death was confirmed, a woman from the Transnistrian region of Moldova.
 31 March 2020: after 280 tests were performed, a record number of 55 new cases were confirmed, of which 48 cases were with local transmission, while 7 were import cases (of which 6 were from the United Kingdom and 1 from Austria). Thus, the total number of infected persons since 7 March 2020 reached 353. At the same time, 4 patients were treated and discharged from hospitals, the total number of recoveries reaching 22. Also, during 31 March 2020 the fourth death was confirmed, a man from the Briceni District of the Republic of Moldova.

April 2020 
 1 April 2020: the fifth death was confirmed, a person from the Transnistrian region.
 2 April 2020: the sixth death was confirmed, a 53-year-old person from Ștefan Vodă District, which was hospitalized in a hospital from Chișinău. The patient also had other chronic diseases.
 27 April 2020: the quarantine regime in the Carahasani village of the Ştefan Vodă District (established on 1 April 2020) was lifted.

1–15 May 2020 
 9 May 2020: during this day, 1254 new tests, both primary and repeated, were performed. As a result, 139 new cases, all with local transmission, were registered, and thus, the total number of infected persons since 7 March 2020 reached 4867. The territorial distribution of these new cases was the following: Chisinau Municipality - 42; Transnistrian region - 16; Cahul District - 8; Balti Municipality - 7; Ungheni District - 7; Gagauzia Autonomous Territorial Unit - 6 (all in Ceadir-Lunga District); Soroca District - 6; Edinet District - 5; Ocnita District - 5; Straseni District - 5; Ialoveni District - 4; Anenii Noi District - 3; Căușeni District - 3; Criuleni District - 3; Dubăsari District - 3; Rezina District - 3; Basarabeasca District - 2; Fălești District - 2; Hîncești District - 2; Orhei District - 2; Călărași District - 1; Leova District - 1; Rîșcani District - 1; Ștefan-Vodă District - 1; Telenești District - 1. Of the total number of the new registered cases in this day, 25 were employees of medical institutions: doctors - 6, nurses - 14, support staff - 5. Also, 9 deaths were registered during that day (the highest daily fatality since the first case was registered in Moldova on 7 March 2020), and thus, the total number of deaths reached 161.
 15 May 2020: 1344 tests were performed during this day (1117 primary tests and 227 repeated tests). As a result, 192 new cases were registered and thus, the total number of infected persons since 7 March 2020 reached 5745. Of the total number of the new registered cases, 18 were employees of medical institutions: doctors - 5, nurses - 8, support staff - 5. On the same day, 52 persons recovered (the total number of recoveries reached 2280) and 8 persons died (the total number of deaths reached 202).
The Extraordinary National Commission of Public Health adopted the Decision No. 10 which provided the following:
 The state of emergency in public health is declared for the entire territory of the Republic of Moldova for the period 16 May - 30 June 2020, with the possibility to extend this period depending on the evolution of the epidemiological situation.
 The Ministry of Health, Labour and Social Protection and the National Agency for Public Health are designated as the responsible public authorities to manage the public health emergency.
 The decisions of the Extraordinary National Commission of Public Health are mandatory for the authorities of the central and local public administration, for the legal and natural persons, regardless of the field of activity and the legal organisational form.
 Non-compliance with the provisions/measures established by the National Commission of Public Health is a danger for the public health and will serve as a basis for the prosecution of administrative offences or criminal offences.

State of emergency in public health  (since 16 May 2020)

Since 16 May 2020 
 16 May 2020: 1429 tests were performed during this day (1180 primary tests and 249 repeated tests). As a result, 189 new cases were registered and thus, the total number of infected persons since 7 March 2020 reached 5934. Of the total number of the new registered cases, 30 were employees of medical institutions: doctors - 9, nurses - 13, support staff - 8. On the same day, 64 persons recovered (the total number of recoveries reached 2344) and 5 persons died (the total number of deaths reached 207).

Vaccination

Moldova started its vaccination campaign on 2 March 2021 after it received 21,600 units of the Oxford–AstraZeneca COVID-19 vaccine from a donation by Romania given on 27 February 2021. This country had already promised Moldova on 29 December 2020 that it would gift it a total of 200,000 vaccine doses as part of a collaboration project regarding the COVID-19 pandemic and other topics between Moldova and Romania. 1,810 of the vaccines that Romania donated were used in Transnistria as well. Moldova would also receive some 14,400 Oxford–AstraZeneca vaccine doses through the COVAX program for helping poor countries acquire COVID-19 vaccine units on 5 March 2021, becoming the first European country to do so. Moldova received further donations from Romania on 27 March 2021 (50,400 vaccine units), on 17 April 2021 (132,000 vaccine doses) and on 7 May 2021 (100,800 vaccine doses).

The country was also donated 2,000 Sinopharm BIBP vaccine units from the United Arab Emirates (UAE) on 13 March 2021, 71,000 vaccine doses from Russia in two occasions (24 April 2021 and 30 April 2021) and 150,000 vaccine units from China on 27 April 2021. Moldova also ordered 100,000 vaccine doses from China to buy them, and they arrived at the same day as those that were donated.

Statistics
Important notice: as mentioned by the Minister of Health, Labour and Social Protection of the Republic of Moldova on 25 April 2020, the number of recoveries reported by the authorities of the Republic of Moldova includes only the persons from the medical institutions that are controlled by the constitutional authorities of the Republic of Moldova, and does not include persons that recovered in the Transnistrian region of Moldova. Therefore, the real number of recoveries shall be bigger than the number reflected in the charts below. Also, as the number of active cases is calculated by excluding from confirmed cases the number of recoveries and deaths, the real number of active cases shall be smaller than the number reflected in the charts below.

Total No. of cases

No. of new cases per day

No. of deaths per day

No. of recoveries per day

No. of active cases in each day

No. of new primary tests performed per day

Source of data for the number of daily tests: for 8–14 and 16 March 2020: the report of the Minister of Health, Labour and Social Protection presented at the press-conference on 1 May 2020; for 15, 17, 25 and 26 March 2020, 28 March - 6 April 2020 and since 8 April 2020 - the press releases of the Minister of Health, Labour and Social Protection of the Republic of Moldova; for 18–24 March 2020 the number of daily performed tests was announced in the daily press conferences after the meetings of the Single Command Center for the management of the crisis triggered by COVID-19 (the press conferences are available at www.privesc.eu and www.realitatealive.md).

Total number of cases by age
(Confirmed during 7 March - 22 August 2020)

Total number of cases by age and sex 
(Confirmed during 7 March - 22 August 2020)

Total number of cases by sex, in %
(Confirmed during 7 March - 22 August 2020)

Total number of cases: women 
(Confirmed during 7 March - 22 August 2020)

Total number of cases by type of transmission
(Confirmed during 7 March - 23 August 2020)

Total number of deaths by age 
(Confirmed during 7 March - 22 August 2020)

Total number of deaths by age and sex 
(Confirmed during 7 March - 22 August 2020)

Total number of deaths by sex, in % 
(Confirmed during 7 March - 22 August 2020)

The daily evolution

Note: Imp. = import cases; Loc. = local transmission cases; Susp. = suspected cases; n/a = data is not available.

See also 

 Moldovan–Romanian collaboration during the COVID-19 pandemic
 COVID-19 pandemic by country and territory
 COVID-19 pandemic in Europe
 COVID-19 pandemic in Romania
 COVID-19 pandemic in Ukraine

References

External links 
 COVID-19 in the Republic of Moldova: daily situation (see also the mobile version).Ministry of Health, Labour and Social Protection of the Republic of Moldova.
 Press releases of the Ministry of Health, Labour and Social Protection of the Republic of Moldova
 National Agency for Public Health of the Republic of Moldova
 АО «Экономическое обозрение «Логос-пресс» № 11 (1321) 27 Мар. 2020 "Вся информация о COVID-19"

 
Moldova
Moldova
Disease outbreaks in Moldova
2020 in Moldova
2021 in Moldova